Pool D of the 2019 Rugby World Cup began on 21 September 2019. The pool included 2015 runners-up and quarter-finalists Australia and Wales. They were joined by Georgia, who automatically qualified for the first ever time. They were joined by regional qualifiers from the Americas, Uruguay (Americas 2), and Oceania, Fiji (Oceania 1).

Wales and Australia qualified for the quarter-finals, with Wales taking top spot in the pool courtesy of a 29–25 win over the Wallabies in the two sides' second match of the tournament. Fiji, Georgia and Uruguay each won one match, but three bonus points for Fiji meant they finished in third place and qualified for the 2023 Rugby World Cup.

Overview
Pool D opened with Australia beating Fiji by 18 points in Sapporo after Fiji led by two points at half-time. Australia scored four tries in the second half for the bonus point. Wales beat Georgia 43–14 at City of Toyota Stadium, after leading 29–0 at half-time and 22–0 after three tries in the first 19 minutes. In Kamaishi, Fiji scored the opening try against Uruguay. Two mistakes within eight minutes gave Teros the lead before a try from Juan Manuel Cat enhanced it to 12 points at half-time. Three Fijian tries in the second half were to no avail as two penalty goals from Felipe Berchesi gave Uruguay their first win in a World Cup since 2003. In Kumagaya on 29 September, Georgia recorded a 33–7 win over Uruguay. Dominant work by their forwards in the second half laid the foundation for the bonus-point victory. Over in Chōfu, Dan Biggar scored the fastest drop goal in World Cup history as Wales led 23–8 at the half. Two second-half tries from Australia brought the scores to within a point but the Welsh held out for a 29–25 win.

A second half performance from Fiji at a wet Hanazono Rugby Stadium saw the Fijians record their first win of their 2019 World Cup campaign as they won 45–10 over Georgia. This was partly due to Semi Radradra scoring two tries while also aiding in setting up three more tries as Fiji scored seven tries to one in the bonus-point victory. Another slow start for the Australians in their game with Uruguay did not stop them from recording a win over the South Americans, with Tevita Kuridrani and Dane Haylett-Petty each getting two tries in the 35-point victory at Ōita Stadium. Four days later at the same stadium, Fiji got off to a 10–0 lead with the tries coming from Josua Tuisova and Kini Murimurivalu within eight minutes. Fiji would hold their lead until the 31st minute when Josh Adams scored his second try of three for the match. Wales increased their lead from there to win 29–17, qualifying for the quarter-finals with Australia. The penultimate match of Pool D saw Australia outlast a tough Georgia in difficult conditions in Fukuroi, as they won 27–8. Wales would finish undefeated with a 35–13 win over Uruguay at Kumamoto Stadium to record a bonus-point victory and set up a quarter-final with France while Australia came in second.

Standings

All times are local Japan Standard Time (UTC+09)

Australia vs Fiji

Wales vs Georgia

Notes:
Levan Chilachava (Georgia) earned his 50th test cap.
Alun Wyn Jones equalled Gethin Jenkins record as the most capped player for Wales with 129 caps.
Jonathan Davies' try was the fastest scored by a Welsh player at a Rugby World Cup.

Fiji vs Uruguay

Notes:
Germán Kessler (Uruguay) earned his 50th test cap.
This was Uruguay's first Rugby World Cup win since beating Georgia at the 2003 Rugby World Cup.
This was Uruguay's first win over a Pacific Island nation.
This was the first time that Uruguay has defeated a team that were placed in the top 10 of the World Rugby Rankings.

Georgia vs Uruguay

Notes:
Facundo Gattas' red card meant that Uruguay became the first team to receive red cards in two consecutive World Cups.
Georgia's first try was the first try Georgia had ever failed to convert at a Rugby World Cup.
This was the first time that Georgia gained a Try Bonus Point.

Australia vs Wales

Notes:
James O'Connor (Australia) earned his 50th test cap.
Alun Wyn Jones became the most capped player for Wales with 130 caps, surpassing Gethin Jenkins record of 129.
Dan Biggar scored the fastest drop goal in Rugby World Cup history, with the referee signalling the score after 36 seconds.

Georgia vs Fiji

Notes:
This is Fiji's biggest winning margin over Georgia.

Australia vs Uruguay

Notes:
Jordan Petaia (Australia) made his international debut.
Matt To'omua (Australia) earned his 50th test cap.

Wales vs Fiji

Notes:
Dominiko Waqaniburotu (Fiji) earned his 50th test cap.

Australia vs Georgia

Notes:
This is the first meeting between the two nations.
Rob Simmons (Australia) become the 11th player to earn his 100th test cap for his country.
Mamuka Gorgodze (Georgia) played his last international game.

Wales vs Uruguay

Notes:
Ignacio Dotti (Uruguay) earned his 50th test cap.
With this win, Wales topped their pool for the first time since 1999 and won all four of their pool matches for their first time since the pools were expanded to five teams in 2003.

References

Pool D
2019–20 in Welsh rugby union
2019 in Australian rugby union
rugby union
2019 in Fijian rugby union